Pierre-Yves Le Borgn’ (born 4 November 1964 in Quimper) is a French Jurist and politician. He is a member of the Socialist Party (France). He was the deputy for the Seventh constituency for French residents overseas from 2012 to 2017.

Footnotes

Sciences Po alumni
Socialist Party (France) politicians
1964 births
Living people
Deputies of the 14th National Assembly of the French Fifth Republic